Eosphodrus is a genus of ground beetles in the family Carabidae. This genus has a single species, Eosphodrus potanini. It is found in China.

References

Platyninae